Vanessa Downing (born 5 May 1958) is an Australian actress and singer, voice artist and lawyer   
 
Downing was appearing with singing group The Madrigals, an acapella group who were performing at the Sydney Opera House, when she was given the role of matriarch foster mother Pippa Fletcher in Home and Away

Downing other than her TV and film roles, is also a prominent actor in theatre, who has appeared in numerous productions.
 
She is also a lawyer with law firm Craddock Murray Neumann, a role she juggles alongside her acting career

Career

After leaving school, Downing attended the University of Sydney, and attained her master's degree in English Literature. She subsequently trained in drama at the Australian Theatre for Young People.

Her early roles were in theatre starting from 1977, and roles include Three a Penny, Who's Afraid of Virginia Woolf and King Lear. She is a well-known and prominent stage actress and has featured in many productions

Television roles starting from the early 1980s' include All Saints, classic '80s soap opera Sons and Daughters, G.P., Water Rats,  HeadLand and Packed to the Rafters. She had a role in the Kingswood Country re-boot series Bullpitt!, and has appeared in numerous mini-series and made for TV films.

Home and Away
Downing is best known for her regular role as an original cast member of the television soap opera Home and Away  playing a role many years her senior as foster mother Pippa Fletcher, replacing Carole Willesee, the wife of newsreader Mike Willesee, at short notice. The casting news hit the headlines at the publicity launch of the soap. The role had been auditioned for by future Neighbours star Jackie Woodburne.
 
When Downing left the series in 1990, the part was recast, and taken over at short notice by Debra Lawrance who went on to play the character from 1990 to 1998, with subsequent guest appearances. After Lawrance took over the role, the character remarried to Michael Ross (played by Lawrance's husband Dennis Coard) and now known as Pippa Ross, was awarded a fictitious OAM for her services as a foster parent.

Post-Home and Away
Post Home and Away Downing has continued to work extensively in theatre, though she has continued to appear on TV. She had guest roles in Water Rats, All Saints, Big Sky, G.P., A Country Practice, Bullpitt!, Funeral Going, Double Skulls, Melba and Packed to the Rafters.

Downing also studied law, becoming a part-time lawyer in 2006. She specialised in immigration law for many years and worked for a law firm in Sydney.

Vanessa appeared in several shorts during 2020 and 2022. The most recent is called Voice Activated. In October 2022, Vanessa was a guest on Ray Meagher's 'This is Your Life' episode  where she appeared alongside fellow "Early Years" cast members Roger Oakley (Tom), Alex Papps (Frank) and Sharyn Hodgson (Carly).

Filmography

Film

Television

Theatre
Theatre productions 
Source: AusStage

References

External links
 

1958 births
Living people
Australian television actresses
Place of birth missing (living people)
University of Sydney alumni